Abū Bakr ibn Muḥammad, reigned 1525–1526, was a sultan of the Sultanate of Adal in the Horn of Africa. The historian Richard Pankhurst credits Abu Bakr with founding the city of Harar, which he made his military headquarters in 1520.

Reign
Abu Bakr organized Somali troops, then attacked sultan Garad Abun Adashe and killed him, making himself sultan. However, his control over Adal was disputed by Imam Ahmad ibn Ibrahim al-Ghazi, who eventually defeated Abu Bakr and killed him. The Imam then made Abu Bakr's younger brother, Umar Din, the new sultan, although the latter only reigned as a puppet king.

See also
Walashmaʿ dynasty
Siege of Hubat

Notes

Works cited

Year of birth unknown
1526 deaths
16th-century monarchs in Africa
Sultans of the Adal Sultanate
16th-century Somalian people